Bournemouth Borough Council was the local authority of Bournemouth in Dorset, England and ceased to exist on 1 April 2019. It was a unitary authority, although between 1974 and 1997 it was an administrative district council with Dorset. Previously most of the borough was part of Hampshire.

The Borough can trace its history back to 27 August 1890 when the Municipal Borough of Bournemouth was created by Royal Charter. On 1 April 1900 it received County Borough status which lasted until 1974.

In February 2018 the 'Future Dorset' plan was approved by the Secretary of State for Housing, Communities and Local Government Sajid Javid. Bournemouth, Christchurch and Poole borough councils merged on 1 April 2019 into Bournemouth, Christchurch and Poole Council.

Government and politics

The borough was administered by Bournemouth Borough Council.

Wards
The council had 18 wards covering the borough.

 Boscombe East
 Boscombe West
 Central
 East Cliff & Springbourne
 East Southbourne & Tuckton
 Kinson North
 Kinson South
 Littledown & Iford
 Moordown
 Queen's Park
 Redhill & Northbourne
 Strouden Park
 Talbot & Branksome Woods
 Throop & Muscliff
 Wallisdown & Winton West
 West Southbourne
 Westbourne & West Cliff
 Winton East

Composition
The Council consisted of 54 elected members, 3 from each of the 18 wards. Prior to 2003 there were 19 wards (57 members). Elections took place every four years where all seats were contested.

The composition of the council:

The council was abolished on 1 April 2019 and replaced by Bournemouth, Christchurch and Poole Council.

Coat of arms

The arms of Bournemouth were granted on 24 March 1891.

See also
Bournemouth local elections

References

 
Former unitary authority councils of England
Leader and cabinet executives
Local education authorities in England
Billing authorities in England
2019 disestablishments in England
Local authorities in Dorset